The MAS-49 is a French semi-automatic rifle that replaced various bolt-action rifles as the French service rifle that was produced from 1949. It was designed and manufactured by the government-owned MAS arms factory. The French Army formal designation of the MAS-49 is Fusil semi-automatique 7 mm 5 M. 49 ("semi-automatic rifle of 7.5mm model 1949").

The initial MAS-49 semi-automatic rifle was produced in limited quantities (20,600 units), whereas the shorter and lighter variant, the MAS-49/56, was mass produced (275,240 units) and issued to all branches of the French military.  Overall, the MAS-49 and 49/56 rifles gained the reputation of being accurate, reliable and easy to maintain in adverse environments. All the MAS-49 and 49/56 rifles feature a rail on the left side of their receivers to accommodate a designated rifle scope.

The MAS-49 and MAS-49/56 were replaced as French service rifles by the FAMAS assault rifle in 1979.

History
The MAS-49 arrived after a series of small, distinct design improvements. Today, this might be termed spiral development, where small elements are changed with successive models, rather than large significant changes.  The MAS-49 semi-automatic rifle evolved from the prototype MAS-38/39 and from the MAS-40, and lastly from the post-war MAS-44 and its minor variants 44A, 44B and 44C.  Although 50,000 MAS-44 rifles were ordered in January 1945, only 6,200 were delivered to the Marine Nationale.  The MAS-49 was formally adopted by the French Army in July 1949.  Its final form the MAS 49-56 was the French service rifle until adoption of the FAMAS.

As a service rifle, the MAS-49 replaced the diverse collection of aging bolt-action rifles (MAS-36, Lee–Enfield No4, M1903A3 Springfield, U.S. M1917, Berthier, and K98k) which had been absorbed into French service after the end of World War II. It saw significant service with French troops in the latter stages of the First Indochina War, as well as during the Algerian War and the Suez Crisis.  The MAS-49 series had a reputation for reliability in conditions of poor maintenance, sometimes being cleaned with nothing more than rags and motor oil. The 49 and 49/56 series could also endure harsh service environments, seeing combat in Algeria, Djibouti, Indochina, French Guiana, and the Battle of Kolwezi.

An improved version called the MAS-49/56 was introduced in 1957 and incorporated lessons learned from service in Algeria, Indochina, and the Suez Crisis. The rifle was shortened and lightened to improve mobility for mechanized and airborne troops, and a knife bayonet was added. The MAS-49 built-in rifle grenade launcher was replaced by a combination compensator/rifle grenade launcher that fired NATO-standard 22mm rifle grenades. The rifle also incorporates an integral grenade launching sight that is attached to the front sight block and a gas cutoff that prevents gas from entering the gas tube from the gas port when firing grenade launching blank ammunition.

Attempts were made to replace the MAS-49, in the form of the MAS-54 and the FA-MAS Type 62, both 7.62×51mm NATO battle rifles, but neither were successful. The MAS-49/56 ended production in 1978 and was replaced with the 5.56×45mm NATO caliber FAMAS bullpup assault rifle. The MAS-49/56 was withdrawn from service in 1990. Whereas only 20,600 MAS-49 were manufactured, the MAS-49/56 was mass-produced, attaining a total of 275,240 rifles issued between 1957 and 1978.

Technical characteristics
The direct impingement gas system was first applied in 1901 to a 6mm semi-automatic experimental rifle (the ENT B-5) designed by Rossignol for the French military. Although several experimental prototypes using a tilting bolt and direct impingement had been tested by MAS since 1924, the immediate precursor to the MAS 7.5mm semi-automatic rifle series is the MAS-38/39. It was successfully tested in March 1939, just before World War II, and followed in May 1940 by the nearly identical MAS 1940. Similar direct impingement designs include the Swedish semi-automatic Ag m/42 adopted in 1942, and the US M16 select-fire rifle adopted in 1963.  In the AG42B and MAS systems, gas is vented from a port on top of the barrel through a small diameter tube to a hollow located on the front face of the bolt carrier.  The contained forces of the gases move the carrier to the rear against the operating spring pressure with enough momentum to open the bolt, and within a short distance the end of the tube is exposed vent to the atmosphere.  The M16 system vents gas from the barrel through a tube and into the body of the bolt carrier where it expands.  Rings on the bolt body form a seal and the expanding gases move the bolt carrier to the rear, which starts the bolt opening cycle.  The spent gases then vent through now exposed holes in the side of the bolt carrier. 

The MAS system has the advantage of not depositing gas fouling on the bolt itself, a separate part located underneath the bolt carrier. All the French MAS 7.5mm semi-automatic rifles mentioned herein feature a rear-locking tilting bolt, as on the M1895 Colt–Browning machine gun, the Browning Automatic Rifle (1918), the MAS-1924 to MAS-1928 experimental semi-auto rifles, and the Russian Simonov SVT-38 (1938) and SVT-40 (1940) rifles.  The MAS direct impingement design reduced the number of bolt moving parts to only six: the bolt carrier, then the rear locking tilting bolt which carries the extractor, the ejector and the firing pin, and lastly the recoil spring. It takes only a few seconds to disassemble the entire bolt mechanism for cleaning.

The same 10-round detachable magazine fits the MAS-44, MAS-49 and MAS-49/56 rifles. The earlier MAS-40 (1940) rifle had a 5-round magazine within the receiver, as on the bolt action MAS-36 rifle. The rifle can still be fed by stripper clips, and have a stripper clip guide built into the bolt face. Lastly, the MAS-49 and MAS-49/56 are equipped with a rail on the left side of the receiver. It allows for the immediate installation of a "Modele 1953" APX L 806 (SOM) 3.85 power telescopic sight by sliding it into place and then locking it in with a small pressure lever. The MAS-49 and MAS-49/56 are capable of consistently hitting individual man-size targets up to 400 meters with the adjustable peep sight and up to 800 meters with the APX L 806 telescopic sight. The bore is counter sunk at the muzzle to protect the rifling and preserve accuracy. The barrel is freely floating.

Syrian Contract Rifles
Syria contracted with MAS for 6,000 MAS-49 rifles. These rifles, along with 12,000 MAS-36 rifles and a production facility for 7.5x54mm ammunition were delivered in the early 1950s. The MAS-49 was used until the mid-late 60s when they were replaced with AK-47 assault rifles. Syrian contract rifles differed from the French service model by having a spike bayonet identical to that of the MAS-36, as well as different stocks and metal parts to incorporate this change. These rifles are dated 1953 and features serial numbers in the F33.000 to F39.000 range.

Surplus imports to the US

Many MAS-49/56 rifles imported as surplus into the United States were rechambered locally by Century Arms International to fire the 7.62mm NATO round. However several user reports have noted that these particular conversions were often unsatisfactory (resulting in numerous action stoppages and misfires) due to imperfect workmanship. Furthermore, the shortening of the barrel to allow rechambering brings the gas vent closer to the chamber hence creating a higher stress on the bolt carrier. In addition to these Century Arms conversions, approximately 250 MAS-49/56 rifles were converted in France to 7.62×51mm NATO for use by the French National Police.  These rifles are not known to have the reliability issues that plague the later Century Arms conversions. Some have been able to improve reliability by modifying the gas shutoff pin with a tapped set screw for gas adjustment.

Commercial  7.5×54mm "French" ammunition made in countries other than France for current distribution has been known to produce burst fire (2 or 3 rounds at a time) because of more sensitive primers. The original heavy steel firing pins on the MAS-49 and 49/56 can be replaced by commercial titanium firing pins which are much lighter and generally cure the problem of burst fire on these weapons. It is also possible to prevent these slamfires by shortening the firing pin by approximately 0.5 mm, or by modifying the bolt to accommodate a firing pin return spring.

Some users have been able to convert 20 round FN-FAL magazines to work in the .308 guns and 25 round FM 24/29 light machine gun or 35 round Reibel machine gun mags for the original 7.5x54 caliber.

Users

 
 : MAS-49 and MAS-49/56
 : MAS-49/56
 : MAS-49/56
 : 60 MAS-49/56 in service in 1963 with Gendarmerie
 : MAS-49/56
 : MAS-49/56
  EOKA: stolen MAS-49 were used during the Cyprus Emergency
  Eritrean Liberation Front: obtained some MAS-49/56 via French Djibouti
 
 : MAS-49/56
 : MAS-49/56
 : MAS-49 and MAS-49/56
 
 : MAS-49/56
 : MAS-49/56
  Compagnie des Carabiniers du Prince: MAS-49
 : MAS-49/56
 : MAS-49/56
 : MAS-49/56
 : MAS-49/56
 : MAS-49/56
 
 : MAS-49 and MAS-49/56

See also
 Fusil Automatique Modele 1917—Earlier French Army semiautomatic rifle
 FN Model 1949

References

 Barnes, Frank C., Cartridges of the World, DBI Books Inc. (1989).
 Huon, Jean; Proud Promise—French Semiautomatic Rifles: 1898–1979, Collector Grade Publications, 1995. .
 Smith, W.H.B.; Small Arms of the World (1967).
 Walter, John; Rifles of the World, 3rd Edition (2006).

External links

 MAS-49 and MAS 49/56 (France) - Modern Firearms
 MAS 49: A Universal Service Rifle
 Buddy Hinton French MAS 44 49 49/56 Collection (pictures)
 MAS 44-49 Manual 1953
 MAS 49 Manual 1950
 MAS 49 Manual 1951
 MAS 49 Manual 1953
 MAS 49 Manual 1970
 MAS 49/56 Manual 1974
 
 

Infantry weapons of the Cold War
Rifles of the Cold War
Semi-automatic rifles of France
7.5×54mm French firearms
Weapons and ammunition introduced in 1949